Mason's Island (Algonquin: Chippachaug - meaning: a separated place) is an inhabited island at the mouth of the Mystic River, in Stonington, Connecticut. The island was named after Major John Mason who was granted the island in recognition for his military services in the 1637 Pequot War in nearby Mystic. This island remained in the Mason family for over 250 years, from 1651 to 1913. Since then the Allyn family have been stewards of it, and most of the island is owned by the Mason's Island Company and regulated by property deeds under the Mason's Island Property Owners Association (MIPOA). The Mason's Island Marina and the Mystic River Marina are located on the north end of the island. Mason's Island is connected to the mainland by a causeway.

Geography
A quarry supplying rough granite for breakwaters (e.g. at Newport, Rhode Island) was located at Pine Hill on the northwestern side of the island.

There is a  nature preserve located in about the middle of the island. This nature preserve features a large salt marsh with surrounding woods that can be accessed by multiple trails. In the southern end of the island there is a large fresh water pond that was formerly used for harvesting ice.

Notable natives and residents
Mary Wilkinson Streep - fine artist, editor and mother of actress Meryl Streep

See also

 Ram Island is an island located close to Mason's Island.
 Enders Island is an island connected to Mason's Island by a causeway.
 Fishers Island is an island located close to Mason's Island.

References

External links
Mason's Island Property Owners Association
Township of Stonington

Mystic, Connecticut
Stonington, Connecticut
Landforms of New London County, Connecticut
River islands of Connecticut
Long Island Sound